nVent SCHROFF GmbH is a German manufacturer of electronic packaging products.  nVent SCHROFF products include cabinets, housings, chassis and related components for multiple markets such as telecommunications, data centers and traffic management.  nVent SCHROFF GmbH is headquartered in Straubenhardt near Pforzheim, and was founded in 1962 by Gunther Schroff. It is now part of the UK-based company nVent Electric plc. nVent employs 9,000 people worldwide of which about 1,500 are part of the brand Schroff.

The company runs in accordance with the ISO 9001 and ISO 14001 standards and is certified to OSHAS 18001. Schroff is one of the largest employers in the Karlsruhe/Pforzheim region.

History 
In the early years Schroff only manufactured power supplies. By the mid-1960s the Schroff Europac Rack was the outstanding product of the 19 inch division. Rapid acceptance of Schroff electronic packaging products in the major electronics markets of the U.S. and Japan made Schroff the standard for electronic design. Through its participation in international standardization groups such as the IEC, Schroff was the pioneer of 19-inch cabinets, and also for the standard dimensions of the rack unit (RU) and division unit (TE). Schroff was part of British conglomerate Pentair from 1994 until 2018. On April 30, 2018 Pentair split into two companies, and Schroff became part of the British conglomerate nVent Electric plc.

Development 
A large portion of the products that Schroff manufactures are customer-specific. This led to the creation of integration and manufacturing centers specifically to address customized products.  Groups such as Front Panel Express, were created work with extremely short lead times.

Production and Competence Centers  

The main work of the Straubenhardt facility is administration, development, metal processing, special tool manufacture, painting, plating, the manufacture and assembly of electronics components.

Schroff Locations 

In addition to production in Straubenhardt, Schroff has other production facilities in France and Poland as well as sales and integration centers worldwide.

Production 

As of June 2018

Sales and Integration Centers 

Schroff UK Ltd. in England
Schroff Scandinavia AB in Sweden and Finland
Schroff S.R.L. in Italy
Schroff GmbH/S.p.z.o.o. in Warsaw, Poland
Hoffman Schroff Pte. Ltd. in Singapore
Schroff K.K. in Yokohama, Japan.

Other manufacturing and solution centers owned by Pentair in the United States, Mexico, Brazil, China, India and Poland.

Markets 
Schroff, with its cabinets, cases and racks is established in the following markets:

Telecommunications
Automation
Measurement, control and regulation technology
Data and network technology
Defense technology and aviation
Railway and Traffic technology

Product Range 
Industrial, electronic, networking, and server cabinets for indoor and outdoor applications
19" table and tower cases, 19" racks, and enclosures, wall cases
Front panels, plug-in modules, subracks and printed circuit boards
Power supplies for measurement and control technology
Climate control such as 19" fan trays, 19" blowers, filtered fans, heaters, heat exchangers, cooling devices
Racks and systems such as AdvancedTCA, AdvancedMC, MicroTCA, CompactPCI, VMEbus, VME64x bus and disk drive units
Backplanes, test adapters, and power strips for electronics industry

Education 
Since the late 1960s, Schroff has invested in the education and training of its employees for development of team skills, presentation skills, and product knowledge. More than 30 trainees are currently employed by Schroff. Trained professionals are the following

Diploma - Business Administration (BA) of the Department of Industry
Diploma - Engineering / f (BA) of the Department of Electrical Engineering
Diploma - Engineering / f (BA) of the Department of Mechatronics
Electronics engineer for equipment and systems
Industrial business
Industrial business with the additional skill of External Trade Assistant
Computer science specialist
Industrial mechanic
Construction mechanic
Tools mechanic
Engineering draftsperson
Specialist for Warehouse Logistics
Schroff works together for BA-training with the Cooperative Education Karlsruhe.

References 

Electronics companies of the United States